Dewees is a surname. Notable people with the surname include:

Donnie Dewees (born 1993), American baseball player
Edwin Dewees (born 1982), American mixed martial artist
James Dewees (born 1976), American musician
William Potts Dewees (1768–1841), American physician

See also
Dewes